The 2013 Tallahassee Tennis Challenger was a professional tennis tournament played on hard courts. It was the 14th edition of the tournament which was part of the 2013 ATP Challenger Tour. It took place in Tallahassee, United States between 29 April and 5 May 2013.

Singles main-draw entrants

Seeds

 1 Rankings are as of April 22, 2013.

Other entrants
The following players received wildcards into the singles main draw:
  Reid Carleton
  Dominic Cotrone
  Salif Kanté
  Austin Krajicek

The following players received entry from the qualifying draw:
  Ilija Bozoljac
  Christian Harrison
  Greg Jones
  Michael Venus

Doubles main-draw entrants

Seeds

1 Rankings as of April 22, 2013.

Other entrants
The following pairs received wildcards into the doubles main draw:
  Andrés Bucaro /  Benjamin Lock
  Salif Kanté /  Takura Happy

Champions

Singles

 Denis Kudla def.  Cedrik-Marcel Stebe, 6–3, 6–3

Doubles

 Austin Krajicek /  Tennys Sandgren def.  Greg Jones /  Peter Polansky, 1–6, 6–2, [10–8]

External links
Official Website

Tallahassee Tennis Challenger
Tallahassee Tennis Challenger